The highland brush mouse (Abeomelomys sevia), also known as the Menzies' mouse, is a species of rodent in the family Muridae. It is endemic to Papua New Guinea, and is found in montane moss forests and in alpine zones over 2,000 m. It is the only species in the genus Abeomelomys, although it has been placed in Pogonomelomys in the past.

Names
It is known as ymgenm  (or yamganm ) in the Kalam language of Papua New Guinea.

References

 

Rats of Asia
Old World rats and mice
Endemic fauna of Papua New Guinea
Rodents of Papua New Guinea
Mammals described in 1935
Taxonomy articles created by Polbot
Rodents of New Guinea